Steel Curtain is a steel roller coaster located at Kennywood amusement park in West Mifflin, Pennsylvania, United States, near Pittsburgh. Themed to the Pittsburgh Steelers, the roller coaster is named after the Steel Curtain, the nickname for the Steelers' defensive line during the 1970s.

Steel Curtain is located on the former site of the Log Jammer, a flume ride that closed in 2017. The current roller coaster was announced in July 2018 following a two-phase teaser campaign, Project 412, that generated publicity for the ride. The track was topped out in March 2019; after a series of weather-related delays, the ride opened on July 13, 2019. Steel Curtain received Amusement Today magazine's Golden Ticket Award for Best New Roller Coaster in 2019.

History

Development 
The Kennywood amusement park in West Mifflin, Pennsylvania, closed its Log Jammer flume ride in September 2017. Demolition of Log Jammer began in January 2018 to make room for a new attraction, which would open the following year. The demolition process was completed that March, and workers started clearing the site and installing caissons for the new attraction. In June 2018, Kennywood announced Project 412, a two-phase teaser campaign for the new ride. During the first phase, a clue was revealed on a virtual scratchcard on Facebook every Thursday. The scratchcard game revealed nine numbers, each of which corresponded to a ride statistic. The second phase, involving an online word search, was launched on July 4, 2018; entrants were asked to look for words corresponding to the nine statistics. The first twelve people to guess all of the words correctly would be invited to the attraction's opening.

Kennywood announced on July 19, 2018, that it would build a steel coaster, Steel Curtain, as part of a new themed area called Steelers Country. The ride would be named after the Steel Curtain, the nickname given to the defensive line of the Pittsburgh Steelers football team from the 1970s. It would be the park's ninth operating roller coaster. Track pieces for Steel Curtain arrived at the park in August 2018. Kennywood drained its lagoon and closed its Paddle Boats attraction so workers could lay the ride's footers. Vertical construction began that November, and the front car of a train was placed on display at the annual International Association of Amusement Parks and Attractions exposition in Orlando, Florida. The first of the ride's nine inversions, the cutback, was completed the following month. The lift hill was being constructed by February 2019, and the tallest point of the ride was topped off the next month. At that time, nearly half of the ride's inversions had been completed.

Though the ride was originally scheduled to open in April 2019, delays in construction and testing pushed the opening to the summer. Many of the delays were attributed to heavy rainfall during 2018. Additionally, the construction cranes that installed the track and supports had to shut down if the wind speed was too high. Testing began on June 22, 2019, shortly after the final piece of track was installed on June 18. The ride had to undergo at least 1,000 test runs before it opened to the public. The test runs, which largely used weighted dummies, were intended to simulate a wide range of real-life conditions.

Opening 
Steel Curtain soft opened for the press and enthusiasts on July 12, 2019. Several Steelers players attended the soft opening, including Steelers defensive end Cam Heyward and former players Mike Wagner and John Banaszak. The winners of the Project 412 competition, who came from as far away as California and Texas, were also invited to the ride's soft opening. The ride officially opened to the public one day later on July 13, 2019. A technical issue on opening day, in which one of the trains stopped momentarily while climbing the lift hill, resulted in the ride closing for the rest of the day. 

On August 3, 2019, Steel Curtain was closed for adjustments, reopening four days later on August 7. In a Facebook post, Kennywood attributed the ride's downtime to the fact that Steel Curtain was a "unique prototype ride"; a former president of the American Coaster Enthusiasts said that such downtime was common for prototype rides. Steel Curtain did not operate during the 2020 season as a result of the COVID-19 pandemic. Steel Curtain reopened during the 2021 season. The ride closed again for repairs in June 2022 before reopening the weekend of July 14, 2022.

Characteristics 

It also became the tallest roller coaster in Pennsylvania, and it had more inversions than any other coaster in the United States. Steel Curtain is located within Kennywood's  Steelers Country area, which, according to the Pittsburgh Gazette, was "believed to be the first pro sports team tie-in at an amusement park".

Steel Curtain's construction required 152 concrete footers, 113 pieces of track that weighed  each, and over 21,000 bolts. The track pieces are colored black, while the support beams are yellow, representing the colors of the Pittsburgh Steelers. The majority of the ride's pieces were manufactured in the United States, although some pieces had to be imported. The ride's exit is through a gift shop within a building that contains the Steelers Experience, which includes various football-themed activities.

Steel Curtain has two trains, where riders are seated two across in each row with two rows per car. Both trains contain six cars for a total of 24 riders per train. The restraint system consists of lap bars and a seatbelt. Each train is painted black with yellow, matching the colors of the track and supports, with white stripes to resemble a Pittsburgh Steelers jersey. The seats were designed to resemble a football, with laces painted in the headrests over a brown background. The front car of one train has the number 19 painted on it, while the front car of the other train has the number 33. These numbers represent 1933, the year that the Pittsburgh Steelers were founded.

Ride experience

Immediately after leaving the station, the train climbs a  lift hill, which is angled 50 degrees off the ground. The ascent up the hill is occasionally accompanied with the Styx song "Renegade". The lift hill uses a variable speed drive. The train climbs most of the lift hill relatively slowly, speeding up near the top after it has passed several sensors. After cresting the hill, it dips slightly and veers left into the world's tallest inversion, a  "Drachen Fire Dive Drop" (named for the now-demolished Drachen Fire). The train drops  out of the inversion. It then banks sharply left, reaching a point close to the ground and traveling back toward the station. It veers left again and enters a banana roll, an element named after its characteristic shape, that inverts riders twice and raises the train to its second-highest point off the ground. 

Riders descend low to the ground once more into a small airtime hill heading back toward the first drop, entering a sea serpent element with two more inversions. This is followed by an airtime hill and the coaster's sixth inversion, a dive loop that turns the train 180 degrees and sends it back toward the station. After a brief straightaway, riders experience a weightlessness maneuver in a zero-g stall inversion, sometimes referred to as a top gun stall. This inversion travels over Kennywood's lagoon, a National Historic Landmark. The coaster's finale follows, with the train entering a corkscrew and cutback in short succession, completing the eighth and ninth inversions respectively. The cutback ends with a slight jump up onto the final brake run, where the train makes its way back into the station.

Reception 
At a preview event for the ride in 2019, Cam Heyward of the Pittsburgh Steelers said: "You just want to be a part of something like this and to be a Steeler ride inside Pittsburgh it's just unbelievable." A reporter for WGN-TV wrote: "What’s really special about this coaster is how they were able to fit a ride that takes you upside down so many times into this space. The ride goes back and forth through itself so many times. It’s remarkable." Arthur Levine of USA Today wrote: "Except for one brief pop out of my seat, there were scarcely any negative-G sensations. This is a thrill machine designed for intense speed, tight turns and inversions." Amusement Today annual Golden Ticket Awards ranked Steel Curtain as the Best New Roller Coaster of 2019.

See also 
 2019 in amusement parks

References

External links
 

Roller coasters in Pennsylvania
Kennywood
Pittsburgh Steelers
Best New Roller Coaster winners
S&S – Sansei Technologies